Raoul Sarrazin (26 July 1938 – 22 July 2020) was a Canadian boxer. He competed in the men's light welterweight event at the 1960 Summer Olympics. He defeated Francois Sowa of Luxembourg to advance to the second round, where he lost to Kim Deuk-bong by disqualification.

References

External links
 

1938 births
2020 deaths
Canadian male boxers
Olympic boxers of Canada
Boxers at the 1960 Summer Olympics
People from Lanaudière
Light-welterweight boxers